Franz Grafetsberger is a retired slalom canoeist who competed for Austria in the 1950s. He won a gold medal in the folding K-1 team event at the 1953 ICF Canoe Slalom World Championships in Meran.

References

Austrian male canoeists
Possibly living people
Year of birth missing
Medalists at the ICF Canoe Slalom World Championships